James Edward "Jay" Luck (born July 11, 1940) is a retired American hurdler and sprinter who mostly competed in the 400 m hurdles. He placed fifth at the 1964 Summer Olympics. At the AAU championships, he was fourth in 1961–62, second in 1964, and third in 1965.

References

American male hurdlers
American male sprinters
1940 births
Living people
Olympic track and field athletes of the United States
Athletes (track and field) at the 1964 Summer Olympics